Enda is an Irish given name. Though predominantly a male name, it can refer to a man or a woman.

It may refer to:

 Enda of Aran (died c. 530), Irish saint
 Enda Barrett (born 1987), Irish hurler
 Enda Bonner (born 1949), Irish politician
 Enda Colleran (1942–2004), Irish Gaelic football manager and player
 Enda Gormley (born 1966), Irish former Gaelic football player
 Enda Kenny (born 1951), Irish politician, Taoiseach of Ireland (2011–2017)
 Enda Kenny (singer), Irish-born Australian folk singer and songwriter
 Enda Markey (born 1976), Irish-born Australia-based theatrical producer and former singer and actor
 Enda McCormick (born 1997/8), Irish Gaelic footballer
 Enda Oates (born 1962), Irish actor
 Enda McCallion (born 1967), Irish film director
 Enda McDonagh (1930–2021), Irish priest of the Catholic Church
 Enda Rowland (born 1995), Irish hurler
 Enda Scahill, Irish banjo player
 Enda Stevens (born 1990), Irish footballer
 Enda Varley, Irish Gaelic footballer
 Enda Walsh (born 1967), Irish playwright
 Enda Williams (born 1985), Irish Gaelic footballer
 Enda (Halloween), a character from the 1979 novelization Halloween by Curtis Richards

See also
Ender (disambiguation)
Edna (disambiguation)
List of Irish-language given names

Irish-language given names
Irish-language masculine given names